Cigarette lighter may refer to:

 Cigarette lighter receptacle, an in-car electric socket
 Lighter, a portable device used to create a flame